The Namla–Tofanma languages are a small family of languages of New Guinea, consisting of Namla and Tofanma. Usher (2020) classifies them as a branch of the West Pauwasi languages. Foley (2018) classifies them as an independent language family.

References

 
West Pauwasi languages